Welles Remy Crowther (May 17, 1977 – September 11, 2001) was an American equities trader and volunteer firefighter known for saving as many as 18 lives during the September 11 attacks in New York City, during which he lost his own life.

Early life
Welles Remy Crowther was the first born of three children. His parents, Jefferson and Allison, raised him and his two sisters, Honor and Paige, in the New York City suburb of Nyack, New York. Through his father, he was a grandson of Bosley Crowther, film critic of The New York Times from 1940 to 1967. As a child, Crowther saw his father getting dressed for church and wrapping a small comb in a blue or red bandana he kept in his right hip pocket. When Welles was six years old, his father gave him a red bandana that would become Crowther's trademark, one that Crowther would wear under all of his sports uniforms in high school.

At 16, Crowther joined his father as a volunteer firefighter, becoming a junior member of the Empire Hook and Ladder Company. He later attended Boston College, where he played lacrosse. In 1999, Crowther graduated with honors with a degree in economics. He subsequently moved to New York City, taking a job as an equities trader for Sandler O'Neill and Partners, settling into an office on the 104th floor of the South Tower of the World Trade Center. He later entertained dreams of joining the FDNY or the FBI or CIA.

September 11 attacks
On September 11, 2001, nine minutes after United Airlines Flight 175 struck the South Tower between floors 77 and 85 at 9:03 a.m., Crowther called his mother from his office at 9:12 a.m., leaving the message, "Mom, this is Welles. I wanted you to know that I'm okay." Crowther made his way to the 78th-floor sky lobby, where he encountered a group of survivors, including a badly burned Ling Young, who worked on the 86th floor in New York's Department of Taxation and Finance. Young had been among a group of people waiting at a bank of elevators to evacuate when the plane hit the tower, and was one of 17 survivors from at or above the impacted floors in the Twin Towers. Crowther, carrying a young woman on his back, directed them to the one working stairway. The survivors followed him 17 floors down, where he dropped off the woman he was carrying before heading back upstairs to assist others. By the time he returned to the 78th floor, he had a bandana around his nose and mouth to protect him from smoke and haze. He found another group of survivors, which included AON Corp. employee Judy Wein, who worked on the 103rd floor and was in pain from a broken arm, cracked ribs and a punctured lung. According to Wein, Crowther assisted in putting out fires and administering first aid. He then announced to that group, "Everyone who can stand, stand now. If you can help others, do so." He directed this group downstairs as well. As occupants of the Tower headed for the street, Crowther returned up the stairs to help others. He was last seen doing so with members of the FDNY before the South Tower collapsed at 9:59 a.m.

Crowther's body was found in March 2002, alongside several firefighters and emergency workers bunched in a suspected command post in the South Tower lobby. The New York medical examiner's office said his body was found intact, with no signs of burns, and that authorities speculated that he was aiding the rescue effort as a civilian usher when the building collapsed. Crowther's family was unaware of the details of his activities between his last phone call to his mother and his death, until Allison Crowther read Judy Wein's firsthand account in The New York Times of being saved by a man in a red bandana, which led to Allison meeting with the people Welles had saved, including Wein and Young. They confirmed from photographs the identity of the man who aided them. A mostly completed New York City Firefighter application was discovered in his home after his death.  According to survivor accounts, Crowther saved as many as 18 people following the attacks.

Legacy

Crowther's parents, with the support of a Michigan foundation, created the Red Bandana Project, a character-development program for classrooms, sports teams, camps and youth programs. The family also established the Welles Remy Crowther Charitable Trust, with which they fund charitable work.

The Welles Remy Crowther Red Bandana Run, a 5-kilometer road race, is held every October at Boston College.

In 2006, Crowther was posthumously named an honorary New York City firefighter by Commissioner Nicholas Scoppetta.

That same year, Crowther's Boston College lacrosse teammate, Tyler Jewell, wore a red bandana in honor of Crowther when he competed as a member of the United States snowboarding team in the 2006 Winter Olympics.

During the September 10, 2011, UCF-Boston College football game in Orlando, Florida, a day before the 10th anniversary of the September 11 attacks, both schools honored Crowther. Boston College players wore helmet stickers featuring Crowther's signature red bandana during the game, and Crowther's sisters, Honor Fagan and Paige Crowther, were introduced to the crowd during the third quarter. On September 13, 2014, Boston College played the University of Southern California (USC) and the team wore uniforms symbolizing Crowther's red bandana, including a helmet stripe, cleats and gloves with a red bandana pattern. 

In 2013, Crowther's sister, Honor Crowther Fagan, published a children's book about Welles's actions during the September 11 attacks called The Man In the Red Bandanna with illustration by his uncle John M. Crowther.

Every year since 2014 Boston College has chosen one home football game to serve as the "red bandana game" with special red bandana themed uniforms.

At the National 9/11 Memorial, Crowther is memorialized at the South Pool, on Panel S-50. President Barack Obama, during his May 15, 2014, dedication of the museum, said of Crowther, "They didn't know his name. They didn't know where he came from. But they knew their lives had been saved by the man in the red bandana. He called for fire extinguishers to fight back the flames. He tended to the wounded. He led those survivors down the stairs to safety, and carried a woman on his shoulders down 17 flights. Then he went back. Back up all those flights. Then back down again, bringing more wounded to safety. Until that moment when the tower fell." One of Crowther's bandanas is on display at the museum.

He was the subject of the 2017 feature documentary Man in Red Bandana. The film was narrated by Gwyneth Paltrow.

The Premier Lacrosse League honors him though the Welles Crowther Humanitarian Award. The award is given to a player in the league who has made a meaningful impact in their community.

References

Further reading

External links 

 "Welles' Story". Welles Remy Crowther Charitable Trust.
 Fellowship of the Red Bandana
 "The man in the red bandana". CNN. 2002.
 "'Man in the Red Bandana' Died Saving Others". Fox News. September 10, 2002

1977 births
2001 deaths
American financial businesspeople
Morrissey College of Arts & Sciences alumni
Boston College Eagles men's lacrosse players
Businesspeople from New York City
Terrorism deaths in New York (state)
Victims of the September 11 attacks
People from Nyack, New York
American terrorism victims
People murdered in New York City
Male murder victims
Lacrosse players from New York (state)
American firefighters
20th-century American businesspeople
World Trade Center